The following is a list of events affecting Canadian television in 2012. Events listed include television show debuts, finales, cancellations, and channel launches, closures and rebrandings.

Events

January

February

March

April

May

June

July

August

September

October

November

December

Television programs

Programs debuting in 2012 

Series currently listed here have been announced by their respective networks as scheduled to premiere in 2012. Note that shows may be delayed or cancelled by the network between now and their scheduled air dates.

Programs ending in 2012

Programs changing networks 
The following shows will air new episodes on a different network than previous first-run episodes:

Made-for-TV movies and miniseries

Networks and services

Network launches

Network conversions and rebrandings

Deaths

See also 
 2012 in Canada
 List of Canadian films of 2012

References

External links